Janez Trdina (29 May 1830 – 14 July 1905) was a Slovene writer and historian. The renowned author Ivan Cankar described him as the best Slovene stylist of his period. He was an ardent describer of the Gorjanci Ridge and of the Lower Carniolan region of Slovenia. Trdina Peak, the highest peak of Gorjanci Ridge, situated on the border between southeastern Slovenia and Croatia, was named for him in 1923.

Biography
Trdina was born in Mengeš in the northern Carniola, then part of the Austrian Empire. He attended school in Ljubljana and studied history, geography, and Slavic philology in Vienna. He worked as a teacher in Croatia, in Varaždin and in Rijeka. In 1867, he was retired on charges of misleading students with his radical liberal political views. He moved to Bršljin near Novo Mesto, and later to the town itself.

Work 
Trdina travelled widely across the Lower Carniola, compiling notes on the life and customs of local people. His notebooks were filled with folk sayings, folk tales, anecdotes, and customs. Trdina edited them in an emphasized realistic, even naturalistic manner, rejecting the Romantic vision of an idyllic countryside. In 1882, he published these notes in a volume titled Bajke in povesti o Gorjancih (Tales and Stories of the Gorjanci Hills).

References

External links
 

1830 births
1905 deaths
People from Mengeš
19th-century Slovenian historians
Slovenian ethnographers
Slovenian poets
Slovenian male poets
University of Vienna alumni
19th-century poets